Neotermes castaneus, known generally as the southern damp-wood termite or Florida dampwood termite, is a species of termite in the family Kalotermitidae. It is found in the Caribbean Sea, Central America, North America, and South America.

References

Further reading

 

Termites
Articles created by Qbugbot
Insects described in 1839